The NÖ Open is a professional tennis tournament played on clay courts. It is currently part of the ATP Challenger Tour. It is held annually in Tulln an der Donau, Austria since 2021.

Past finals

Singles

Doubles

References

ATP Challenger Tour
Clay court tennis tournaments
Tennis tournaments in Austria